Sclerophrys tuberosa is a species of toad in the family Bufonidae. It is found in southeastern Nigeria, Cameroon, southwestern Central African Republic, Equatorial Guinea (including Bioko), Gabon, and northern Democratic Republic of the Congo and Republic of the Congo. Common names rough toad, warty toad, and Fernando Po toad have been proposed for it.

Description
The body is compact and the snout is short. The eyes are relatively large. The parotoid glands are very large. Dorsal skin is densely covered by long, spiny warts, while ventrally skin is granular. The toes have rudimentary webbing. Dorsal coloration is light to dark brown with irregular black spots; a light vertebral line is sometimes present. The limbs have black crossbars. The venter is yellow with darker spots or mottling.

The male advertisement call is a quiet, low-pitched "rrrou" or "rroua".

Habitat and conservation
Sclerophrys tuberosa inhabits moist lowland tropical rainforest in swampy areas, avoiding well-drained forest. Breeding takes place in small streams; the males call from cavities near water.

Sclerophrys tuberosa is very common in parts of its range (e.g., Cameroon) but rarer in other areas. It tolerates some habitat modification and can be found in secondary forest, but cannot survive outside forest and is thereby negatively impacted by forest loss. However, it occurs in several protected areas.

References

tuberosa
Frogs of Africa
Amphibians of West Africa
Amphibians of Cameroon
Amphibians of the Central African Republic
Amphibians of the Democratic Republic of the Congo
Amphibians of Equatorial Guinea
Amphibians of Gabon
Fauna of Nigeria
Amphibians of the Republic of the Congo
Taxa named by Albert Günther
Amphibians described in 1858
Taxonomy articles created by Polbot